Robert Nicholson Dresser  (October 4, 1878 – July 27, 1924) was a Major League Baseball pitcher. He played for the Boston Beaneaters of the National League in one game on August 13, 1902.  As the Beaneaters had a double header that day, Dresser, a left-hander, started one of the games against the Pittsburgh Pirates.  He pitched a complete game in his only major league appearance, losing to the Pirates 6–1.  Although Dresser gave up six runs on 12 hits, only three of the runs against him were earned.  He also struck out eight batters and issued no walks in his lone performance on the mound at the major league level.  At the plate, Dresser also doubled for his lone major league hit, going 1–4 in the game.

External links
Baseball Reference.com page

1878 births
1924 deaths
Boston Beaneaters players
Major League Baseball pitchers
Baseball players from Massachusetts
Patton Pigmies players
Hornell Pigmies players
Punxsutawney Policemen players
Addison-Wellsville Tobacco Strippers players